Tetragonoderus quadriguttatus is a species of beetle in the family Carabidae. It was described by the renowned French entomologist Pierre François Marie Auguste Dejean in 1829.

References

quadriguttatus
Beetles described in 1829